DronaHQ, is a low code app development platform, from Deltecs InfoTech Pvt. Ltd., Mumbai, India that helps to build internal tools, and business apps. The platform advertises multi-experience output (Mobile & Web) with visual builders, online database, code editors, prebuilt templates, configurable workflows, and analytics. It allows users to build applications on top of data sources. 

DronaHQ has announced the launch of an enhanced Workflow builder.

History
While working at Wipro Technologies, Jinen Dedhia & Divyesh Kharade saw students studying preparatory exam materials during commutes in 2005. They worked out a mobile learning solution that allowed word lists to be pushed to mobile handsets. The team continued delivering mobile learning services until they launched their own company, Delta Technologies. (later renamed to Deltecs InfoTech Pvt. Ltd. in 2007)

The same year, Tata McGraw-Hill approached Deltecs to develop mobile learning products for a range of exam-based materials. This project was called Mobile Ads (MAD). As the market for mobile learning grew, the team started work on a common mobile platform that could support multiple sources of content, called DRONA.

Drona was first implemented at Wipro Technologies in 2009. A module named Drona VCAST was deployed on the BES servers at Wipro to train and engage senior executives via video on their BlackBerry smartphones. The project was a success and Deltecs' shifted its focus to smartphones exclusively.

In 2010, Drona VCAST was renamed to Drona Mobile when it supported multiple formats including video, audio, documents, presentations and more. The same year, DRONA Mobile was also launched for iPhone, iPad and Android devices.

In 2014, Drona Mobile was remodeled into DronaHQ, a simplified enterprise mobility platform.

In early 2019, DronaHQ evolved to a comprehensive low code app development platform.

Supported platforms
DronaHQ is available for iPhone, iPad, and Android smartphones and tablets and Web.

References

Enterprise software
Mobile software
Mobile business software
Android (operating system) software
IOS software
BlackBerry software